Mokalpur is a village in Alapur tehsil of Ambedkar Nagar district in Uttar Pradesh state, India. It belongs to Faizabad division.

Description 
Mokalpur is situated in Ambedkar Nagar district. Agriculture is the main profession of this village. Hindi is the local language.

The village has a primary school and madrasa.

Transportation 

See also

References 

Villages in Ambedkar Nagar district